The Samsung SGH-T319 is a cell phone for T-Mobile service introduced in Q1 2006, and was designed for both the regular T-Mobile service and the To-Go! Prepaid Services. Designed to mimic the design of the older model, the Samsung SGH-t309, the only difference is that it is light blue.

Features for the phone include T-Zones, wireless internet, speakerphone and a camera. Memory space is about 3 MB, which can hold about 30 640 X 480 VGA photos. Instant messaging services include AOL Instant Messenger, ICQ, and Yahoo messenger. When released, the starting price was about US$139.

References
CNET - Samsung SGH-T319

T319
Mobile phones introduced in 2006